Jorge Fernando Barbosa Intima (born 21 September 1995), known as Jorginho, is a Bissau-Guinean professional footballer who plays as a winger for Bulgarian club PFC Ludogorets Razgrad and the Guinea-Bissau national team.

Club career
Born in Bissau, Guinea-Bissau, Jorginho came through the youth ranks at Manchester City after signing at the age of 17. After agreeing to a one-year contract extension on 7 July 2015, he was limited to reserve team football.

In the last minutes of the 2016 winter transfer window, Jorginho moved to Portugal and joined F.C. Arouca on a three-and-a-half-year deal. He made his Primeira Liga debut on 7 February, coming on as a 78th-minute substitute in a 2–1 away win against FC Porto.

Jorginho scored a hat-trick in a 4–1 away victory over Moreirense F.C. on 17 December 2016. In the following transfer window he was transferred to AS Saint-Étienne of the French Ligue 1, who loaned him six months later to G.D. Chaves in a season-long move after acquiring him on a permanent basis.

On 19 June 2018, Jorginho signed with Bulgarian club PFC CSKA Sofia on loan until the end of the campaign. One year later, he agreed to a permanent contract at PFC Ludogorets Razgrad of the same country.

Jorginho joined Wadi Degla SC of the Egyptian Premier League in late November 2020, on loan with an option to buy.

International career
Jorginho represented Portugal at youth level. He was part of the squad at the 2014 UEFA European Under-19 Championship, appearing in three games – including eight minutes in the final against Germany – for the eventual runners-up.

On 22 March 2018, Jorginho made his debut for his native Guinea-Bissau, starting in a 2–0 friendly defeat to Burkina Faso. He was part of the squad that appeared in the 2019 Africa Cup of Nations.

International goals
 Guinea-Bissau score listed first, score column indicates score after each Jorginho goal.

References

External links

Portuguese League profile 

1995 births
Living people
Portuguese sportspeople of Bissau-Guinean descent
Sportspeople from Bissau
Bissau-Guinean footballers
Portuguese footballers
Association football wingers
Manchester City F.C. players
Primeira Liga players
F.C. Arouca players
G.D. Chaves players
Ligue 1 players
AS Saint-Étienne players
First Professional Football League (Bulgaria) players
PFC CSKA Sofia players
PFC Ludogorets Razgrad players
Egyptian Premier League players
Wadi Degla SC players
Ekstraklasa players
Wisła Płock players
Portugal youth international footballers
Guinea-Bissau international footballers
2019 Africa Cup of Nations players
2021 Africa Cup of Nations players
Bissau-Guinean expatriate footballers
Portuguese expatriate footballers
Expatriate footballers in England
Expatriate footballers in France
Expatriate footballers in Bulgaria
Expatriate footballers in Egypt
Expatriate footballers in Poland
Bissau-Guinean expatriate sportspeople in England
Bissau-Guinean expatriate sportspeople in France
Bissau-Guinean expatriate sportspeople in Bulgaria
Bissau-Guinean expatriate sportspeople in Egypt
Bissau-Guinean expatriate sportspeople in Poland
Portuguese expatriate sportspeople in England
Portuguese expatriate sportspeople in France
Portuguese expatriate sportspeople in Bulgaria
Portuguese expatriate sportspeople in Egypt
Portuguese expatriate sportspeople in Poland